Parul is a village in the Pursurah CD block  in the Arambagh subdivision of Hooghly district in the Indian state of West Bengal.

Geography

Location

Area overview
The Arambagh subdivision, presented in the map alongside, is divided into two physiographic parts – the Dwarakeswar River being the dividing line. The western part is upland and rocky – it is extension of the terrain of neighbouring Bankura district. The eastern part is flat alluvial plain area.  The railways, the roads and flood-control measures have had an impact on the area. The area is overwhelmingly rural with 94.77% of the population living in rural areas and 5.23% of the population living in urban areas.

Note: The map alongside presents some of the notable locations in the subdivision. All places marked in the map are linked in the larger full screen map.

Demographics
As per the 2011 Census of India, Parul had a total population of 1,368 of which 699 (51%) were males and 669 (49%) were females. Population in the age range 0–6 years was 141. The total number of literate persons in Parul was 1,038 (64.60% of the population over 6 years).

Culture
David J. McCutchion mentions:
Raghunatha temple of the Chakrabarti family as a standard Hooghly-Bardhaman at chala, measuring 22’ 11" x 20’8", possibly built in 1768. It has panoramic battle scenes above the archways and smaller figures round the façade. 
Visalakshi temple as a Midnapore type at chala, measuring 19’6" square, built in 1859. The archways and other panels round the façade are filled with figures.

The Jor Bangla temple (at Sr No S-WB-56) and the Raghunandan temple (at Sr No S-WB-57) at Parul are included in the List of State Protected Monuments in West Bengal by the Archaeological Survey of India.

Parul picture gallery

Click on the pictures to enlarge picture size

References

External links

Villages in Hooghly district